Date is a modern dansband from Sweden. The band was established in 1993.

Melodifestivalen
The band has participated at Melodifestivalen.

 2001: Om du förlåter mig, 6th in the final
 2002: Det innersta rummet, 4th in the semifinal, Vinnarnas val
 2005: Hörde änglarna viska ditt namn, 7th in the semifinal

Discography

Albums
 Kvällens sista dans - 2000
 Allt mina ögon ser - 2001
 Sjunde himlen - 2004
 Här och nu! - 2010
 A Date with the 60's - 2012

Svensktoppen songs
Österäng - 1997
Sofie - 1997
Alexandra - 2001
Om du förlåter mig- 2001
Allt mina ögon ser - 2001
Det innersta rummet- 2002

Failed to enter chart
Kvällens sista dans - 1999
One night in Rio- 2000
Kom o gör mig galen-  2002
Hörde änglarna viska ditt namn - 2005
Ta mig till månen - 2011

References

External links
Official website
Fansite

Musical groups established in 1993
Dansbands
1993 establishments in Sweden
Melodifestivalen contestants of 2005
Melodifestivalen contestants of 2002
Melodifestivalen contestants of 2001